The 2003 Trans-Am Series for the BFGoodrich Tires Cup was the 38th season of the Sports Car Club of America's Trans-Am Series. This year saw the series visit Puerto Rico for the first time; the first race since 1991 not in Canada or the United States. The Rookie of the Year was won by Jorge Diaz, Jr., the Owners Championship was won by the #7 Rocketsports Racing entry and the Manufacturers' Championship was won by Jaguar.

Schedule

The 2003 schedule was released in February 2003 with 11 rounds, featuring the new for 2003 Puerto Rico Grand Prix, and an unconfirmed 12th round to be announced at a later date. In March, the 2003 National Grand Prix of Washington D.C, scheduled for June 28–29, was cancelled due to local environmental and noise concerns. In August, it was announced that the series would be added to the Grand Prix Americas CART weekend.

Results

Final points standings

References

Sources

 

Trans-Am Series
2003 in American motorsport